The Panda Patriot Power Plant is a natural gas-fired power station located in Clinton Township, Lycoming County, Pennsylvania (near Williamsport). It went commercial in July 2016 and construction on the project began in 2013.

It is owned solely by Panda Energy International of Dallas, Texas. The plant was built due to the retirement of about a dozen coal-fired power stations in Pennsylvania, New York and Maryland. After three years of planning and approval by local, state and federal agencies the station construction began in 2013 and took approximately 30 months to complete the total project.

Current status
The plant has been operational since its commission date in 2016. It generates a total of 829 megawatts of electricity by the use of two 400 MW single-shaft power trains. The plant uses Siemens SGT6-8000H gas turbines, Siemens SST-5000 steam turbines, Siemens SGEN6-H hydrogen-cooled generators, Vogt “Smart-Box” Heat Recovery Steam Generators and Air Cooled Condensers. Gemma also constructed ancillary systems and buildings as well as the electrical interconnection facilities and tie-ins for natural gas, water and wastewater.

As of August 2017 the plant serves just over one million homes in Lycoming, Clinton, Potter, Northumberland, Union, Montour, Columbia, Sullivan, Tioga and Bradford counties in Pennsylvania. Along with Chemung, Broome and Steuben counties in New York.

See also

List of power stations in Pennsylvania

References

Energy infrastructure completed in 2016
Natural gas-fired power stations in Pennsylvania
Buildings and structures in Lycoming County, Pennsylvania